Hancock Seamount is a seamount of the Hawaiian-Emperor seamount chain in the Pacific Ocean.

It was formed in the Eocene and Oligocene epochs of the Paleogene Period.  The last eruption from Hancock Seamount is unknown.

See also
List of volcanoes in the Hawaiian – Emperor seamount chain

References

Hawaiian–Emperor seamount chain
Seamounts of the Pacific Ocean
Guyots
Hotspot volcanoes
Eocene volcanoes
Oligocene volcanoes
Paleogene Oceania